John Joseph Rizzo (born October 3, 1980) is an American politician serving as a Democratic member of the Missouri Senate since January 2017. In 2020, Rizzo was elected by his colleagues to serve as Minority Floor Leader. Prior to his election into the Senate, Rizzo was a member of the Missouri House of Representatives, serving the 19th and 40th districts from 2011 to 2017. In the House, Rizzo also served as Democratic Minority Whip.

Early life, education and career
John J. Rizzo was born in Kansas City, Missouri on October 3, 1980 to Henry and Silvia Rizzo. His father was a Missouri State Representative from 1985 until 2002 and in recent years served as chairman of the Jackson County legislature. His mother, like her husband and son, was also a Jackson County legislator. He has one older brother, Tony, who works for the Kansas City Police Department.

Rizzo went on to earn his BA in English and BS in political science from Rockhurst University in his hometown. At Rockhurst, Rizzo was on the board of directors of Old Northeast, Inc., a non-profit that worked to restore homes in the Old Northeast neighborhood of Kansas City. He also became a Jackson County Committeeman as a Young Democrat, serving Ward 11.

Upon his graduation, he was appointed to the board of directors at Truman Medical Centers, serving on the fiscal responsibility committee there until his election to the Missouri House of Representatives in 2011.

Tenure
Rizzo is an opponent of Missouri's new "right-to-work" legislation arguing, "When you look at dollars and cents, I was told in politics years ago, when it's not about the money, it's about the money. I think we all know obviously what it's about. It's about lower wages.

Rizzo has voted against setting a higher bar for discrimination lawsuits, tightening restrictions on lifetime government benefits and unemployment benefits as well as implementing voter identification laws. He has voted for an increase in the sales tax and against any cuts in income or corporate tax rates. His record indicates a pro-choice stance and support for an expansion of insurance coverage.

Controversy

After all the votes were tallied in the highly competitive House District 40 race in 2010, Rizzo led fellow Democrat John Royster by 6 votes (650-644). After an automatic recount was triggered, Rizzo held on to his lead by a single vote, which led Royster to take his case to the Jackson County circuit court over several alleged voting irregularities. Although Kansas City election officials confirmed more than 24 voting discrepancies, Rizzo prevailed.

The Missouri Court of Appeals heard the case but expressed concern that there wasn't enough time for a new primary election. The court ultimately denied Royster's appeal before new evidence was brought forth including three voters who had admitted on camera to KCTV to using a false address in the district in order to vote there.

Three years later, Rizzo's aunt and uncle pleaded guilty to charges filed by Jackson County Prosecutor Jean Peters Baker of illegally voting in 2010, though Rizzo denied any knowledge of the illegal act. The pair was fined and are barred from voting in Missouri for life.

Electoral history

References

External links
 
Legislative website

1980 births
21st-century American politicians
Living people
Democratic Party Missouri state senators
Democratic Party members of the Missouri House of Representatives
Politicians from Kansas City, Missouri